Raluca Olaru and İpek Soylu were the defending champions, but Olaru chose to compete in Wuhan instead. Soylu played alongside Irina Khromacheva, but lost in the semifinal to Tímea Babos and Andrea Hlaváčková.

Babos and Hlaváčková went on to win the title, defeating Nao Hibino and Oksana Kalashnikova in the final, 7–5, 6–4.

Seeds

Draw

Draw

References
Main Draw

Tashkent Open - Doubles
2017 Tashkent Open